There is also a Javorníky mountain range in the Carpathian mountains
The Javornik Hills are a limestone plateau in Slovenia and part of the Dinaric Alps. At the northern edge of the Javornik Hills lies the Postojna Gate.

References

External links

Dinaric Alps
Karst plateaus of Slovenia
Plateaus of Inner Carniola